The Moorings 32 is a French sailboat that was designed by Philippe Briand as a cruiser for Moorings Yacht Charter for use as a yacht charter boat. It was first built in 2002 and served in the Moorings fleet 2006-2009. The boats are no longer in service with Moorings and many are now in private use instead.

The design is a development of the Briand-designed Sun Odyssey 32, with a deeper keel.

Production
The design was built by Jeanneau in France, from 2002 to 2005, but it is now out of production.

Design
The Moorings 32 is a recreational keelboat, built predominantly of fiberglass, with wood trim. It has a fractional sloop rig a nearly plumb stem, a reverse transom, an internally mounted spade-type rudder and a fixed fin keel. It displaces  and carries  of ballast.

The design has sleeping accommodation for four people, with a double "V"-berth in the bow cabin, an "L"-shaped settee and a straight settee in the main cabin and an aft cabin with a double berth on the port side. The galley is located on the starboard side at the companionway ladder. The galley is "U"-shaped and is equipped with a two-burner stove, an ice box and a sink. The head is located amidships on the port side.

Operational history
The Moorings fleet of 32s served from 2006 to 2009 and then were sold off for private use.

See also
List of sailing boat types

References

Keelboats
1990s sailboat type designs
Sailing yachts
Sailboat type designs by Philippe Briand
Sailboat types built by Jeanneau